Missouri Township is one of nine townships in Brown County, Illinois, USA.  As of the 2020 census, its population was 156 and it contained 87 housing units.

Geography

Cemeteries
The township contains these eight cemeteries: Beans, Bell, Clark, Glasgow Farm, Kinman Burial Ground, Linn-Walker Graves, Miller Land and Rigg.

Major highways
  Illinois Route 99

Demographics
As of the 2020 census there were 156 people, 86 households, and 28 families residing in the township. The racial makeup of the township was 98.72% White, 0.00% African American, 0.00% Native American, 0.00% Asian, 0.00% Pacific Islander, 0.64% from other races, and 0.64% from two or more races. None of the population was Hispanic or Latino of any race.

There were 86 households, out of which 2.30% had children under the age of 18 living with them, 32.56% were married couples living together, none had a female householder with no spouse present, and 67.44% were non-families. 57.00% of all households were made up of individuals, and 30.20% had someone living alone who was 65 years of age or older. The average household size was 1.38 and the average family size was 1.93.

The township's age distribution consisted of 2.5% under the age of 18, 19.3% from 18 to 24, 3.4% from 25 to 44, 53% from 45 to 64, and 21.8% who were 65 years of age or older. The median age was 56.5 years. For every 100 females, there were 142.9 males. For every 100 females age 18 and over, there were 136.7 males.

The median income for a household in the township was $65,882. The per capita income for the township was $53,952. None of the population was below the poverty line.

School districts
 Brown County Community Unit School District 1

Political districts
 Illinois's 18th congressional district
 State House District 93
 State Senate District 47

References
 
 United States Census Bureau 2007 TIGER/Line Shapefiles
 United States National Atlas

External links
 City-Data.com
 Illinois State Archives

Townships in Brown County, Illinois
Populated places established in 1853
Townships in Illinois
1853 establishments in Illinois